The 2007–08 Maltese First Division Knock-Out (known as Maltco Lotteries First Division Knock-Out due to sponsorship reasons) was a knockout tournament for Maltese football clubs playing in the First Division. The winners were Dingli Swallows and the runners-up were Vittoriosa Stars.

The competition began on 18 November 2007 and ended on 1 June 2008 with the final.

The competition began with a preliminary round. Four teams played in the preliminary round. The two winners of the preliminary round advanced to the quarter-finals with the rest teams from the First Division. The four winners from the quarter-finals, which were Dingli Swallows, Mosta, Tarxien Rainbows and Vittoriosa Stars, advanced to the semi-finals.

Preliminary round

|colspan="3" style="background:#fcc;"|18 November 2007

|}

Quarter-finals

|colspan="3" style="background:#fcc;"|12 April 2008

|-
|colspan="3" style="background:#fcc;"|13 April 2008

|-
|colspan="3" style="background:#fcc;"|15 April 2008

|}

Semi-finals

|colspan="3" style="background:#fcc;"|27 May 2008

|}

Final

|colspan="3" style="background:#fcc;"|1 June 2008

|}

See also
 2007–08 Maltese First Division

Maltese First Division knock-out
knock-out